Old News is a tabloid-format newspaper containing original articles on ancient history and modern history, written in a popular style.  It is published six times a year by Susquehanna Times & Publishing Co., of Landisville, Pennsylvania.

External links
 Old News website

Newspapers published in Pennsylvania
Works about history